Manuel Hornig (born 18 December 1982 in Kandel) is a German former professional footballer who played as a defender.

References

External links
 

1982 births
Living people
German footballers
Association football defenders
1. FC Saarbrücken players
Kickers Offenbach players
1. FC Kaiserslautern players
Arminia Bielefeld players
TuS Koblenz players
2. Bundesliga players
3. Liga players